Trischman Knob el.  is an isolated summit along the Continental Divide on the Madison Plateau in Yellowstone National Park. The summit was named in 1962 by Assistant Chief Ranger Willam S. Chapman for Harry Trischman (1886–1950). Trischman came to Yellowstone in 1899 with his parents. His father was the post carpenter at Fort Yellowstone. Trischman worked as a U.S. Army scout and in 1916 became one of the first park rangers. He worked as a ranger in Yellowstone until his retirement in 1945. Trischman Knob was one of his favorite backcountry haunts.

See also
 Mountains and mountain ranges of Yellowstone National Park

References

Mountains of Wyoming
Mountains of Yellowstone National Park
Mountains of Teton County, Wyoming